The Akron Zoo is a  non-profit zoo located just west of downtown in Akron, Ohio, United States.

The Akron Zoo is home to over 1,000 animals representing over 100 different species and it has over 400,000 visitors annually. The animal exhibits are divided into six different themed areas containing animals from different regions of the world.  The zoo is the most visited attraction in Summit County.
The Akron Zoo is accredited by the Association of Zoos and Aquariums (AZA) and is a member of the World Association of Zoos and Aquariums. As an AZA member, Akron Zoo participates in breeding programs to save endangered species.

History

In 1900, the  that is now Perkins Woods Park was donated to Akron by George and Ann Perkins, for "the sole purpose of devoting the same to the uses of a public park, especially as a place for recreation for children." To this end, the Akron Museum of Natural History was incorporated in 1950, and the Akron Children's Zoo was opened in 1953 in association with the Museum. The children's zoo illustrated Mother Goose rhymes with live animal exhibits.

Ten new exhibits were opened in 1954, and one more, the Merry Miller, in 1955. With the sponsorship of the Yusef-Khan Grotto, admission was free to all mentally challenged, handicapped, and underprivileged children.

In 1979, the zoo changed its name to the Akron Zoological Park, and the City of Akron turned over governance of the zoo to the Board of Trustees. The City of Akron retained ownership of the land, and non-profit Akron Zoo now owned all of the zoo's contents. The zoo adopted a new theme of "North and South American Animals" to provide a stable base for education and conservation goals.

The Akron Zoo made nearly $500,000 in capital improvements between 1985 and 1988. Special events such as Holiday Lights and Boo at the Zoo bolstered the zoo's annual attendance with 1988 drawing 133,000 guests breaking the 1957 attendance record of 128,344 visitors. As the decade closed, the Akron Zoological Park was accredited by the American Association of Zoological Parks and Aquariums, recognizing the Akron Zoo's professional stature among accredited zoos and aquariums nationwide.

In May 2005, the zoo opened their largest expansion in their history, Legends of the Wild. This area features 16 animal exhibits, over 20 animal species, and over 400 total animals, including snow leopards, jaguars, lemurs, bats, and many more.

On October 1, 2005, the Akron Zoo unveiled Komodo Kingdom Education Center, featuring Komodo dragons, Galapagos tortoises, and Chinese alligators. Certification by Leaders in Energy and Environmental Design (LEED) was achieved. The zoo utilized current green technology for heating and cooling and the building was built using many earth-friendly materials.

In 2010 the zoo opened a carousel named "Conservation Carousel" featuring rare and endangered animals.

The zoo had record attendance in 2017 with 416,942 visitors.

Attractions and regions

The zoo has eight themed areas of the park that are molded after specific regions on the globe.

Legends of the Wild is the Akron Zoo's largest exhibit. It includes a 25-foot waterfall and over 15 animal exhibits. The displays in Legends of the Wild's exhibit include Humboldt penguins, red ruffed lemurs, ring-tailed lemurs, Seba's short-tailed bats, straw-colored fruit bats, alpacas, Andean condors, jaguars, capybaras, snow leopards, tufted deer, Chilean flamingos and white-naped cranes.

Komodo Kingdom is an indoor exhibit featuring a Komodo dragon, Galápagos tortoises, Chinese alligators, and other rainforest species.

Curious Creatures is an indoor exhibit in the Komodo building that features animals and plants that exhibit unique adaptations for survival.

Wild Prairie contains a food service location, snowy owls and the Frontier Town play area.

Lehner Family Zoo Gardens contains the Nature's View and Nature's Theater.

Grizzly Ridge opened in 2013 as the biggest expansion in Akron Zoo's history.

Pride of Africa opened in 2019 on the former Farmlands area, and features a new lion exhibit, a renovated goat boma, and a paddock for Speke's gazelles, white storks, and crested guineafowl, and will also have a second phase which will have giraffes. 

Wild Asia is a new exhibit that opened in May 29, 2021, replacing the tiger valley exhibit. It's now a new home for the zoo's Sumatran tigers, and red pandas, and it also have a new breeding pair of northern white-cheeked gibbons

Animal enrichment activities
Enrichment activities are commonly used in zoos today.  They are characterized as changes in the ordinary that are meant to encourage animals' natural behaviors.  Some of the natural behaviors encouraged from enrichment are foraging for food and hiding in nature's provisions.  Zoo keepers occasionally introduce various scents around an animal's exhibit that are unfamiliar to the animal.  Plants and trees are sometimes added or removed to allow for animal to create new hiding places or  have more open space.  Animals often receive new toys and puzzle feeders in their areas.

Volunteers
The Akron Zoo has had a tremendous amount of funding and help through their adult volunteer program. These volunteers, known as Edzoocators, frequently help out with special events, and their biggest event for the zoo is Boo at the Akron Zoo, which had its 20-year anniversary in 2009. A new addition to the zoo is that of the Jr. Interpreter Teen Program. Started in 2008, the Jr. Interpreters are teen volunteers who spend up to 40 hours each week during the summer to help out around the zoo.

Conservation efforts

The Akron Zoo is involved in several conservation projects that focus in restoration, preservation, and reintroduction.

The Venezuelan Waterfowl Foundation is active internationally and it was formed as a result of the staff's efforts in working with conservationists in Venezuela and other accredited institutions within the zoo community. The Foundation focuses on the conservation of the Andean river systems and is researching the illusive torrent duck.

The Butterfly Conservation Initiative is a partnership of Akron Zoo partnered and the other Ohio zoos, The Wilds, and the Association of Zoos and Aquariums to help create a butterfly habitat at The Wilds.  of open grassland and meadow habitat were planted, creating a suitable site to support a variety of resident and migrant butterfly species.

The Akron Zoo has participated in the Audubon Christmas Bird Census, which is coordinated by the National Audubon Society to document wintering bird populations across the United States. In 2003, participants from the Akron Zoo donated 18.5 hours for the census. The volunteers observed a total of 28 species, and counted 2,568 individual birds.

Gallery

Notes

External links 

Buildings and structures in Akron, Ohio
Zoos in Ohio
Protected areas of Summit County, Ohio
Tourist attractions in Akron, Ohio
Zoos established in 1953